Poppa of Bayeux (born  880 AD), was the wife more danico' of the Viking conqueror Rollo. She was the mother of William I Longsword, Gerloc and grandmother of Richard the Fearless, who forged the Duchy of Normandy into a great fief of medieval France. Dudo of Saint-Quentin, in his panegyric of the Norman dukes, describes her as the daughter of a "Count Berengar", the dominant prince of that region, who was captured at Bayeux by Rollo in 885 or 889, shortly after the siege of Paris. This has led to speculation that she was the daughter of Berengar II of Neustria.

There are different opinions among medieval genealogy experts about Poppa's family. Christian Settipani says her parents were Guy de Senlis and Cunegundis, the daughter of Pepin, Count of Vermandois, and sister of Herbert I, Count of Vermandois. Katherine Keats-Rohan states she was the daughter of Berengar II of Neustria by Adelind, whose father was Henry, Margrave of the Franks, or Adela of Vermandois. Her parentage is uncertain and may have been invented after the fact to legitimize her son's lineage, as many of the fantastic genealogical claims made by Dudo were. Based on her separate more Danico status that differentiates her from Rollo's Christian wife Gisela of France, Poppa's family was unlikely to have been powerful Christian nobility who would have insisted—by force if necessary—on a legal and monogamous Christian marriage for their daughter. Poppa was likely a common woman taken from a country with which the Norse had trade contact. 
A statue of Poppa stands at the Place de Gaulle in Bayeux.

References

880s births
10th-century deaths
10th-century Normans
10th-century Norman women
House of Normandy
Rollo
Duchesses of Normandy
Year of birth uncertain
Year of death unknown